Frederick James Condon (1 March 1903 – 8 June 1965) was an Australian rules footballer who played with South Melbourne in the Victorian Football League (VFL).

Notes

External links 

1903 births
1965 deaths
Australian rules footballers from Victoria (Australia)
Sydney Swans players